The 1977 William Jones Memorial Cup was the first edition of the William Jones Cup held in July 1977 in the span of two weeks.

The games were held in a 10,000 capacity pavilion with poor lighting conditions. In the group stage, the 9 teams were divided into two groups with the top two teams from each group advancing to the next round.

The Eastern Unit of the United States-based Athletes in Action won the 1977 William Jones Cup. Eastern Washington Eagles and the Flying Camels ended up second and third respectively.

Participants
 Athletes in Action - Eastern Unit

 Eastern Washington Eagles
 Flying Camel

 RSEA Engineering
 Yanmar Diesel
 Yue Long

Source

Awards

Notes

References

1977
1977 in Taiwanese sport
1977–78 in European basketball
1977–78 in American basketball
1977 in Asian basketball